Skálholt Cathedral (Icelandic: Skálholtsdómkirkja) is a Church of Iceland cathedral church. The church is the official church of the Bishop of Skálholt, currently Kristján Björnsson.

History
Even though the cathedral contains the seat of the bishop, Skálholt is no longer a diocese in its own right. The Diocese of Skálholt was dissolved in 1801, but re-established as a suffragan diocese in 1909. Thus the bishop is known as a suffragan bishop who assists the Bishop of Iceland. The Bishop of Skálholt is nevertheless responsible for cathedral affairs. 

The cornerstone of the present cathedral was laid in 1956 by Bishop Sigurbjörn Einarsson. It was built between 1956 and 1963 to commemorate the 900 years since the diocese was founded in 1056. The cathedral was consecrated in 1963. It was built on the site of all 9 previous churches that had stood on the exact site throughout the 1000 years since the establishment of the diocese. Excavations carried out on the site prior to the building of the cathedral proved this much. Excavations unearthed several headstones of various bishops of Skálholt, including a stone coffin that included the remains of one of the bishops.

Interior
The cathedral contains a total of 25 stained glass windows made by Gerður Helgadóttir. They are designed in an abstract manner and depict Christian symbolism and some of the medieval bishops of Skálholt. The altarpiece is the work of Nína Tryggvadóttir and depicts Christ coming into the cathedral with the landscape behind depicting Iceland. The pulpit dates from the 17th century and is the one used by Bishop Brynjólfur Sveinsson in 1650.

See also 
 List of cathedrals in Iceland

References

External links
Skálholtskirkjur eru kirkjur þær, sem staðið hafa og sú kirkja sem enn stendur í Skálholti; is.wikipedia.org

Church of Iceland
Cathedrals in Iceland
20th-century Lutheran churches
Churches completed in 1963